The Kazakhstan Second League is the third division of football in Kazakhstan. The League is controlled by the  Kazakhstan Professional Football League  and feeds into the Kazakhstan First League. It is divided in two conferences and runs from spring and to late autumn, making each championship correspond to a calendar year.

2021 Member clubs

Northeast Conference

Southwest Conference

3
Third level football leagues in Europe